Currey Road (station code: CRD) is a railway station that serves the Lower Parel neighbourhood in Mumbai. It is on the Central line of the Mumbai Suburban Railway serving the areas of Lalbaug and Parel.

Currey Road is situated in central Mumbai and is surrounded by famous places like Lalbaug, Lower Parel. There is a flyover (constructed in 1915) which constitutes the biggest part of Currey Road. The Railway station divides the road into two major parts, East and West.

Currey Road Station was originally built to carry horses during the British Raj. During the derby (horse race) season, a special train used to carry horses from the race course to the stud farms in Poona.

See also
 Currey Road Bridge

References

Neighbourhoods in Mumbai
Mumbai Suburban Railway stations